Peter Robert Watson (born 1936) is a retired Australian Anglican bishop. He served as the Anglican Archbishop of Melbourne from 2000 to 2005.

Watson was born in Sydney in 1936. He attended Canterbury Boys' High School. He was ordained as a priest in Sydney in 1962 and consecrated as the Bishop of Parramatta (in Sydney) in 1989 and became Bishop of South Sydney in 1993.  
 
In 2000 he was elected to succeed Keith Rayner as Archbishop of Melbourne and was installed on 14 May 2000. He retired as archbishop effective 31 December 2005. He is married to Margo (Eleanor) Watson.

References

External links 
 "Archbishop's Presidential Charge to Synod"

Living people
20th-century Anglican bishops in Australia
21st-century Anglican archbishops
Anglican archbishops of Melbourne
Assistant bishops in the Anglican Diocese of Sydney
1936 births